Hoogmoed's tree frog (Boana roraima)  is a species of frog in the family Hylidae found in Guyana, possibly Brazil, and possibly Venezuela. Its natural habitats are subtropical or tropical moist montane forests and rivers.

References

Sources
 Reynolds, R., Hoogmoed, M., MacCulloch, R. & Gaucher, P. 2004.  Hypsiboas roraima.   2006 IUCN Red List of Threatened Species.   Downloaded on 21 July 2007.

Boana
Amphibians of Guyana
Amphibians described in 1992
Taxonomy articles created by Polbot